"Notion" is a song by Australian alternative rock artist Tash Sultana, released on 17 June 2016 as the second single from Sultana's extended play Notion (2016). The song was certified platinum in Australia in 2018.

Track listing
Digital download
 "Notion" – 5:41

Digital download
 "Notion"  (radio edit)  – 4:08

Certifications

References 

2016 songs
2016 singles
Tash Sultana songs